Wilson Nqose, (Born Zolile Nqose), is a former Chief of Service Corps in the South African National Defence Force, and a former founding member of the African National Congress's military wing, Umkhonto weSizwe (MK).

Military career
General Nqose joined MK in 1961, being one of the youngest members to join and receive military training in the Soviet Union. In 1964, he was briefly based at Tanzania, before moving to Zambia in preparation for the Wankie battle. Nqose was part of the Wankie Sipolilo Campaign in 1967, alongside Lennox Lagu, Zola Skweyiya and Chris Hani that viciously fought against the South African and Rhodesian Army. He escaped imprisonment and returned to Zambia He later joined the South African National Defence Force, when MK was incorporated into it in 1994 as a Brigadier General. Nqose was promoted to Major General in the late 1990s, before replacing Andrew Masondo as the Chief of Service Corps in 2001. He retired in 2005.

Honours and awards

References 

South African military personnel
UMkhonto we Sizwe personnel
South African generals
South African military officers
1940s births
Living people